Christiano Victor das Neves Silva Felix (born 3 May 2000), commonly known as Christiano, is a Brazilian footballer who currently plays as a midfielder for Náutico.

Career statistics

Club

Notes

References

2000 births
Living people
Brazilian footballers
Association football midfielders
Clube Náutico Capibaribe players
Retrô Futebol Clube Brasil players